The 2022 OFC U-17 Women's Championship, originally to be held as the 2021 OFC U-16 Women's Championship, was to be the 5th edition of the OFC U-16/U-17 Women's Championship, the biennial international youth football championship organised by the Oceania Football Confederation (OFC) for the women's under-16/under-17 national teams of Oceania. The tournament will be hosted by Tahiti. The winner of the tournament will qualify for the 2022 FIFA U-17 Women's World Cup in India as the OFC representatives.

The tournament was originally scheduled to be held between 11–26 September 2021. However, the OFC announced on 4 March 2021 that it had been postponed due to the COVID-19 pandemic, pending FIFA’s confirmation of dates of the 2022 FIFA U-17 Women's World Cup. On 4 June 2021, the OFC announced that the tournament had been rescheduled to June 2022, with the name of the tournament changed from "2021 OFC U-16 Women's Championship" to "2022 OFC U-17 Women's Championship".

New Zealand are the four-time defending champions, having won all four editions held, with the last edition in 2020, originally also to be held in Tahiti, cancelled due to the COVID-19 pandemic.

Teams
All 11 FIFA-affiliated national teams from OFC were eligible to enter the tournament.

Venue
To be confirmed.

Squads

Players born on or after 1 January 2005 are eligible to compete in the tournament.

Qualified teams for FIFA U-17 Women's World Cup
The following team from OFC qualify for the 2022 FIFA U-17 Women's World Cup.

1 Bold indicates champions for that year. Italic indicates hosts for that year.

References

External links
OFC U-16 Women's Championship 2021, at Oceania Football Confederation

2022
2022 FIFA U-17 Women's World Cup qualification
2022 in women's association football
2022 in youth association football
U-16 Women's Championship
Association football events cancelled due to the COVID-19 pandemic
International association football competitions hosted by French Polynesia
June 2022 sports events in Oceania